James Lewis Wilkes, II is an American lawyer. Born in Tampa, Florida, he is known for his advocacy on behalf of nursing home residents who have been victims of abuse.

Legal career
Wilkes and his firm Wilkes & McHugh, P.A. gained national recognition for handling nursing home abuse and neglect lawsuits. He has been featured in People magazine, as well as on television shows such as Dateline, 48 Hours and CBS Evening News. Long-Term Living magazine wrote that Wilkes could be "described as a 'holy terror' for nursing home administrators everywhere" in an article that named him one of the top 10 most influential people in the industry.

In 2017, Wilkes represented comedian Cedric The Entertainer in a lawsuit stemming from the Aliso Canyon gas leak.

He is licensed to practice law in Alabama, Arkansas, California, Florida, Georgia, Kentucky, Mississippi, Pennsylvania, Tennessee and Texas.

Music industry

Wilkes is also involved in the music industry as a performer and business manager. He launched Streamsound Records, along with long-time producer Byron Gallimore.

Red Vinyl Music was established in late 2010 when long-time producer Byron Gallimore partnered with Jim Wilkes and Tim McHugh. In January 2017, Red Vinyl Music sold the rights to 3,000 songs to Ole.

During a 2012 Florida election, Wilkes used his music industry corporations to max out political donations.

Charity
Wilkes donated $100,000 to the relief efforts in Southeast Asia after the 2004 tsunami.

Jim Wilkes also serves as a personal mentor and legal advisor to two nationally-recognized sports champions. Wilkes has been an advisor and friend to former boxing super middleweight champion Jeff Lacy and junior middleweight champion Ronald Winky Wright. Wilkes was nominated for the Al Buck Manager of the Year for 2004–2005 by the Boxing Writers Association of America.

He created an advocacy group, The Coalition to Protect America's Elders, now known as Families for Better Care. The group serves as a voice for nursing home residents. The former Executive Director of Families for Better Care was elected to serve as the president of the nation's largest and oldest nursing home resident advocacy group, The National Consumer Voice for Quality Long-Term Care.

Sources

Florida lawyers
University of South Florida alumni
People from Tampa, Florida
Living people
Stetson University College of Law alumni
Year of birth missing (living people)